The Bacton Altar Cloth is a 16th-century garment that is considered the sole surviving dress of Queen Elizabeth I. The cloth, embroidered in an elaborate floral design and made of cloth of silver, is an important relic of Tudor fashion and luxury trade, containing dyes from as far away as India and Mexico. It was rediscovered in 2015 at St Faith's Church in Bacton, Herefordshire, where it had been used as an altar cloth for centuries. After several years of conservation and restoration, the garment was exhibited to the public in 2019 and 2020 along with the Rainbow Portrait, in which the queen is depicted wearing a highly similar dress.

Description

The garment is made of cream-coloured silk and Italian cloth of silver. Cloth of silver was, under Sumptuary Law, reserved for members of the royal family, which was an early clue of its origin. It was elaborately embroidered with colourful flowers and vegetation in silk, silver and gold thread, including caterpillars and deer. Unusually, the embroidery was stitched straight onto the fabric, indicating expert workmanship and therefore an elite owner. Dye used in the embroidery thread included cochineal red from Mexico, evidence of early trade from North America, as well Indian indigo blue traded through Portugal.

History of the dress

The dress dates to late in Queen Elizabeth I's life, when she was nearly 70. It is highly similar to the embroidered dress she is depicted wearing in her Rainbow Portrait. The style of the floral embroidery puts the dress squarely into the 1590s, as anything from later years would have featured more scroll-like detail on the stems and vines, in line with early Stuart trends; additionally, only inventories from the later part of Elizabeth's reign show such expensive dresses were in her possession.

It was believed the garment was given to Bacton by the Queen in memory of Blanche Parry. Parry, from Bacton, was a personal attendant of the Queen, and held the offices of Chief Gentlewoman of the Queen's Most Honourable Privy Chamber and Keeper of Her Majesty's Jewels. Parry, who never married, remained devoted to Elizabeth and was her longest-serving courtier, by her side for 56 years.

The Altar Cloth had survived the centuries as it was considered a sacred object by the parishioners at St Faith's Church in Bacton, where in 1909, it was framed in oak and mounted on the wall above the pews. Nearby is the Blanche Parry Monument, the earliest depiction of the Queen as Gloriana. For 106 years the framed cloth remained on the north wall, away from direct sunlight, which helped preserve the garment from fading.

Return to prominence
In the early 20th century, Sir Lionel Cust, then Surveyor of the King's Pictures, recognised the importance of the cloth and published an article in 1918 about its similarity to the costume of Elizabeth I depicted in her portraits. 

In 2015, the garment was researched by Ruth Elizabeth Richardson while writing a biography of Blanche Parry and Lady Troy. Richardson recognised the rarity and importance of the cloth. 

Subsequently, Eleri Lynn, a curator at the Historic Royal Palaces who was researching a book on Tudor fashion, saw Richardson's photos of the cloth online. Lynn examined the cloth and discovered it was of extraordinarily high quality, while also observing evidence of pattern cutting that ultimately revealed it had been a dress. Lynn recognised that it is a unique survival, being the only known cloth with direct embroidery from any museum or collection worldwide. This led to the cloth being restored and eventually displayed to the public at Hampton Court Palace.

See also
 List of individual dresses

References

Further reading 
 Richardson, Ruth Elizabeth, Mistress Blanche Queen Elizabeth I's Confidante, (first edition 2007) second edition 2018, Logaston Press, Eardisley, Herefordshire.
 Richardson, Ruth Elizabeth, "Elizabeth I's Earliest Influences: New Discoveries Concerning Blanche Parry, Lady Troy, the Funeral Monuments and the Bacton Altar Cloth", The Court Historian, May 2020.
 Lynn, Eleri, 'The Bacton Altar Cloth: Elizabeth I's 'long-lost skirt'?', Costume, 52:1 (March 2018), pp. 3-25. 
 Lynn, Eleri, Tudor Fashion, 2017, Yale University Press, New Haven and London, in association with Historic Royal Palaces.
 Arnold, Janet, Queen Elizabeth's Wardrobe Unlock'd, 2014, Maney.

External links 
 Hampton Court Palace: See The Lost Dress of Elizabeth I

Elizabeth I
16th-century fashion
English fashion
Royal dresses
Material culture of royal courts
Individual dresses